Tik! Tik! Tik! is a 1981 Indian Tamil-language crime thriller film directed by Bharathiraja, starring Kamal Haasan, Madhavi, Swapna and Radha. It was released on 26 October 1981, Diwali day, and did above average business. The film was remade in Hindi as Karishmaa (1984), with Haasan reprising his role.

Plot 

Sherley is a model who returns to Madras after a modelling stint abroad. She is received by the modelling agency and is soon drugged and operated upon. Her dead body is soon found.

Dileep is a photographer working for a newspaper run by Lakshmi Narayanan. He is a photographer in a beauty pageant run by a rich industrialist, Oberoi, which was won by Sharadha, Radha and Swapna. He becomes professionally involved with Radha and Swapna while romantically involved with Sharadha. Soon Swapna's dead body turns up and he becomes the main suspect in the murder investigation and is on the run from police. As his face is plastered in wanted ads all over the city and police are watching Sharadha's house, he goes to meet Radha.

Radha, who always considered Dileep as her brother as he was always nice to her, helps him and lets him stay in her apartment. The next morning, when Dileep wakes up and turn on the tap, the water is bloody red and he hears screaming coming from the apartment water tank. He goes to investigate when a group of people are gathered around the tank and is shocked to find Radha's bloody body inside the tank. Soon people recognise him from the wanted ad and mistakenly think that he murdered Radha. He is once again on the run from police for the murders.

He starts to investigate the murders and deduce that the only thing the two girls had in common, apart from him, was the modelling agency. When he secretively meets up with Sharadha, he finds a small incision on her body. Remembering that the other two girls had the same incision, he questions her. Although she doesn't remember how she got it, she remembers that she didn't have one before she left on a photo shoot abroad for the agency. She also finds it strange that she was unconscious for a few hours during the shoot but cannot remember what happened.

They eventually find out that Oberoi, has a nefarious business through his modelling agency. He drugs the models during the photo shoot abroad, operates them and smuggles diamonds into India using their bodies. When the models return to India, they again drug the model and take it out and kill the girl.

Dileep gets captured by Oberoi's goons but with the help of his editor and his girlfriend, he has already got the truth out. Before Oberoi can kill Dileep, they hear the police siren coming towards him. Oberoi, an obsessive diamond collector, rather than get caught and go to prison, eats his own diamonds and commits suicide.

Cast 

 Kamal Haasan as Dileep
 Madhavi as Sharadha
 Radha as Radha
 Swapna as Swapna
 Thiagarajan as Victor
 Shamasundar L. Asrani as Oberoi
 Thengai Srinivasan as Lakshmi Narayanan
 V. K. Ramasamy as Sharada's father
 Nisha Noor as Nisha
 Manobala
 Y. G. Parthasarathy
 Sarika as Miss India Sherley (Guest role)

Soundtrack 
The music was composed by Ilaiyaraaja, while the lyrics were written by Kannadasan and Vairamuthu.

Release and reception 
Tik Tik Tik was released on 26 October 1981, Diwali day. S. Shivakumar of Mid-Day called it "One of the worst of Barathi Rajaa's films" which "seems to be a rehash of various 'B' grade Hollywood thrillers" but noted "it has flashes of brilliance". He said the film is doing "superb business" and it could run for the charisma of Kamal Haasan.

References

External links 
 

1980s crime thriller films
1980s Tamil-language films
1981 films
Films about photographers
Films directed by Bharathiraja
Films scored by Ilaiyaraaja
Indian crime thriller films
Tamil films remade in other languages